In Greek mythology, Autonoë (Ancient Greek: Αὐτονόη Autonoê means "think for oneself") may refer to the following personages:

 Autonoë, one of the 50 Nereids, sea-nymph daughters of the 'Old Man of the Sea' Nereus and the Oceanid Doris. Her name means 'giver of inspiration'.
 Autonoë, one of the Danaïdes, daughter of Danaus and Polyxo.
Autonoë, was one of the daughters of Cadmus and Harmonia.
 Autonoë, daughter of Pireus and mother of Palaemon by Heracles. Otherwise, the mother of Palaemon was called Iphinoe, daughter of Antaeus.
 Autonoë, one of Penelope's maids.

Notes

References 

 Apollodorus, The Library with an English Translation by Sir James George Frazer, F.B.A., F.R.S. in 2 Volumes, Cambridge, MA, Harvard University Press; London, William Heinemann Ltd. 1921. . Online version at the Perseus Digital Library. Greek text available from the same website.
Hesiod, Theogony from The Homeric Hymns and Homerica with an English Translation by Hugh G. Evelyn-White, Cambridge, MA.,Harvard University Press; London, William Heinemann Ltd. 1914. Online version at the Perseus Digital Library. Greek text available from the same website.
 Homer, The Odyssey with an English Translation by A.T. Murray, PH.D. in two volumes. Cambridge, MA., Harvard University Press; London, William Heinemann, Ltd. 1919. . Online version at the Perseus Digital Library. Greek text available from the same website.
Kerényi, Carl, The Gods of the Greeks, Thames and Hudson, London, 1951.

Women of Heracles
Nereids
Danaids
Princesses in Greek mythology
Odyssey
Mythology of Argos